Paralia Skotinas is a seaside settlement which is part of the municipality of Dio-Olympos, in the Pieria regional unit, Central Macedonia, Greece. It is 6 κm from Leptokarya, 1 km from Paralia Panteleimonos (Castle) and 1κm from Skotina. In this point its view of the Castle of Platamon, is unique.

External links
Skotina on wikimapia

Beaches of Greece
Populated places in Pieria (regional unit)
Tourist attractions in Central Macedonia